Noyack Road was a railroad station on the Sag Harbor Branch of the Long Island Rail Road in Sag Harbor, New York. While the branch opened in 1869, this station was not added until 37 years later in 1906 as "Lamb's Corner". By 1915, it had been renamed as "Noyack Road".

It was demolished with the rest of the branch shortly after service was withdrawn from the line in 1939.

References

External links
Bob Emery Map of Noyack Road station (Arrt's Arrchives)

Former Long Island Rail Road stations in Suffolk County, New York
Sag Harbor, New York
Railway stations in the United States opened in 1906
1906 establishments in New York (state)
Railway stations closed in 1939
Demolished buildings and structures in New York (state)